The Maa Tarini Temple in Ghatgaon is a famous Hindu Goddess temple dedicated to Maa Tarini.

Deities
Maa Tarini is worshiped here along with some side Gods.

History
It is said by the local people that King of Kendujhar was bringing Tarini Maa from puri to Kendujhar with a condition that if he turn back then she'll not move further. The King was riding a horse and Goddess was following him to Kendujhar. King could know that Maa Tarini was coming behind from the sound of her ornaments but near the ghatagaon in the deep forest the sound of the ornaments didn't came and the king looked back thinking that she's not coming. But Maa Tarini was coming and due to the forest mud her ornaments sounds was not coming. Due to the condition Maa tarini stayed there and worshiped as the queen of Forest.

Festivals
Chaiti Yatra is the most popular and famous festival of this place celebrated in the month of April. Generally it celebrates between the last 5 days of Chaitra and the first 2 days of Baisakha i.e. from 9–15 April of every year. The first day of Baisakha is treated as the Odia New Year (ଓଡ଼ିଆ ନବବର୍ଷ)।
Patua Yatra is another most famous festival of this place celebrated in the month of April.
Ashadhi parba (ଆଷାଢ଼ି ପର୍ବ) is also Celebrated here in the last Thursday of the Odia Month: Asadha (ଆଷାଢ଼ ମାସ)

Gallery

References

External links

 Homepage of Maa Tarini
Official Website of Maa Taraini

Hindu temples in Kendujhar district
Shakti temples